Lars Manfred Ljungman (1 April 1918 – 19 April 1962) was a Swedish ice hockey player. He competed in the men's tournament at the 1948 Winter Olympics.

References

1918 births
1962 deaths
Ice hockey players at the 1948 Winter Olympics
Olympic ice hockey players of Sweden
Ice hockey people from Stockholm
Swedish ice hockey players